Louis and Luca – The Big Cheese Race is a 2015 Norwegian stop motion animated film directed by Rasmus A. Sivertsen from a screenplay by Karsten Fullu, based on the characters by Kjell Aukrust. A sequel to Solan and Ludvig: Christmas in Pinchcliffe (2013), it is the second film in a trilogy of stop motion animated films based on Aukrust's Flåklypa universe, and the fourth film overall. A co-production between Qvisten Animation and Maipo Film, with support and input from the Kari and Kjell Aukrust's Foundation, Louis and Luca – The Big Cheese Race was released in Norwegian cinemas on 25 December 2015, where it received 241,472 admissions. It was followed by Louis & Luca - Mission to the Moon (2018), the final film in Sivertsen's trilogy.

Voice cast 
Norwegian voice cast:
 Kari-Ann Grønsund as Solan Gundersen (Louis) an anthropomorphic magpie.
 Trond Høvik as Ludvig (Luca) an anthropomorphic hedgehog.
 Per Skjølsvik as Reodor Felgen
 Fridtjov Såheim as Ollvar O. Kleppvold
 Bjarte Hjelmeland as Olram Slåpen
 Steinar Sagen as Emanuel Desperados
 Kåre Conradi as Frimand Pløsen
 John Brungot as Melvind and an elderly man

Release 
Louis and Luca – The Big Cheese Race was released in Norwegian cinemas on 25 December 2015, and received 241,472 admissions. It was distributed by Nordic Film Distribution.

References

External links 
 
 
 
 Louis and Luca – The Big Cheese Race at the Danish Film Institute (in Danish)

Films directed by Rasmus A. Sivertsen
2015 films
2010s Norwegian-language films